The International Peace and Security Institute or IPSI is a division of Creative Learning an international nonprofit organization with 501(c)(3) status headquartered in Washington, D.C. Founded in 2009, IPSI was acquired by Creative Learning in November 2016. The Institute's objective is to train young peacebuilding and International Justice leaders in the skills needed to effectively intervene in violent conflict scenarios in pursuit of sustainable peace.

Currently IPSI has two flagship symposiums in Bologna, Italy, and The Hague, The Netherlands. Between 2009 and 2014 more than 400 young professionals and practitioners from over 100 countries have received training from the Institute.

Programs

Bologna Symposium on Conflict Prevention, Resolution, & Reconciliation

Since 2010 and in cooperation with Johns Hopkins University SAIS, IPSI hosts a 4-week symposium in Italy, each year attended by more than 50 young professionals. Participants learn directly from world leaders, and undergo very intensive training from experts, notable academics, and advocates.

The Hague Symposium on Post-Conflict Transitions and International Justice

In partnership with the Netherlands Institute of International Relations Clingendael, this symposium brings together young leaders in the fields of international law, Human Rights, international relations, and the military, to participate in a month-long training on restorative justice, post conflict development and security, reconciliation, among other topics.

Panelists and speakers in this symposium have included:
 ICC Chief Prosecutor Fatou Bensouda
 UN Special Rapporteur on Torture Juan E. Méndez
 Dutch minister and Former UN Special Representative to Sudan Jan Pronk
 Corps Commander, German/Dutch Corps; Former Commander, International Security Assistance Force ISAF, Regional Command South   Lieutenant General Ton van Loon
 Prosecutor of the Special Court for Sierra Leone Brenda Hollis

Peace and Security Report

The Peace and Security Report or (PSR) is free a weekly electronic publication researched and distributed by IPSI. The report reaches about 40 thousand readers per week in most countries around the world.

Thought Leadership

IPSI coordinates regular meetings of influential personalities and panels on relevant contemporary events.

Board of directors
 Pamela Aall: Former Vice President, Domestic Programs, Education and Training Center, United States Institute for Peace
 Cameron M. Chisholm: Executive Director, International Peace & Security Institute
 Chester Crocker: Former U.S. Assistant Secretary of State
 David Crane: Former Prosecutor, Special Court for Sierra Leone
 Chic Dambach: Former President & CEO, Alliance for Peacebuilding
 George Foote: Partner, Dorsey & Whitney LLP; General Counsel, United States Institute of Peace
 Melanie Greenberg: President & CEO, Alliance for Peacebuilding
 Dr. Philip Terrence Hopmann: Director, Conflict Management Department, Johns Hopkins School of Advanced International Studies (SAIS)
 J. Alexander Little: Assistant U.S. Attorney, Nashville, TN
 Kevin Melton: Senior Engagement Manager, AECOM
 William Stuebner: Former Special Adviser to the Prosecutor of the International Criminal Tribunal for the Former Yugoslavia (ICTY); Former Chief of Staff and Senior Deputy for Human Rights of the OSCE Mission to Bosnia and Herzegovina
 Dr. I. William Zartman (Chairman): Professor Emeritus, Johns Hopkins School of Advanced International Studies (SAIS)

Board of Advisors
The International Peace and Security Institute was founded by some of the world's foremost leaders in the fields of conflict resolution and security to address critical unfulfilled educational priorities.
 Ahmedou Ould-Abdallah: Special Representative for the UN Secretary-General
 Betty Bigombe: State Minister for Water Resources in the Cabinet of Uganda, Member of Parliament, Chief Mediator between the Uganda Government and the LRA
 Dr. Francis Deng: Under-Secretary-General of the United Nations; UN Special Adviser for the Prevention of Genocide
 Jan Eliasson: UN Deputy Secretary General; Former President of the sixtieth session of the United Nations General Assembly
 The Hon. Gareth Evans: Former Foreign Minister, Australia; President Emeritus, International Crisis Group
 Dr. Ted Robert Gurr Distinguished University Professor Emeritus, University of Maryland
 Amb. Jacques Paul Klein Special Representative of the Secretary-General and Coordinator of United Nations Mission in Liberia; Special Representative of the Secretary-General to Bosnia and Herzegovina
 Peter Kyle: Lead Counsel, The World Bank
 Dr. John Paul Lederach Professor of International Peacebuilding, University of Notre Dame
 Jeffrey Mapendere:  Executive Director, CIIAN; Sudan Country Director, The Carter Center International Observation Program
 John Marks: President, Search for Common Ground
 Susan Collin Marks: Senior Vice President, Search for Common Ground
 Dr. Joyce Neu: Founder and Senior Associate, Facilitating Peace; Former Team Leader, UN Standby Team of Mediation Experts
 John Prendergast: Founder, The Enough Project
 Dr. Valerie Rosoux: Research Fellow, Belgian National Fund for Scientific Research
 Dr. Ruth Wedgwood: Director, International Law and Organizations Program, Paul H. Nitze School of Advanced International Studies
 Dr. Craig Zelizer: Associate Director, Conflict Resolution Program, Georgetown University

References

External links
 Official website

Non-profit organizations based in Washington, D.C.
501(c)(3) organizations